Club Mahindra is the flagship brand of Mahindra Holidays & Resorts India Limited (MHRIL), an Indian Hospitality company founded in 1996. It is a part of the Leisure and Hospitality sector of the Mahindra Group and provides family holidays on a timeshare basis. MHRIL offers family holidays primarily through vacation ownership memberships for over a period of 25/10 years.

While Club Mahindra is the flagship brand with a 25-year membership, the other products offered by the company are Bliss, Go Zest, Club Mahindra Fundays and Svaastha Spa. As on September 30, 2022, MHRIL has 86 resorts across India & abroad and its subsidiary, Holiday Club Resorts Oy (HCR), Finland, a leading vacation ownership company in Europe has 33 Timeshare Destinations with 9 Spa Resorts across Finland, Sweden and Spain.

History
Club Mahindra Holidays was incorporated as Mahindra Holidays and Resorts India Limited (MHRIL) in the year 1996. Subsequently, the company's status was changed to public limited in the year 1998. In the same year, the company opened its first resort at Munnar. Its next resort was opened in Goa in 1999. At present, the company operates and manages over 110 resorts across the globe of which over 80 are in India.

Mahindra Holidays & Resorts India Limited perceived the vast potential in the exploding travel and hospitality market in the 1990s. The brand saw the wider canvas and responded to diverse insights — a changing economy, the rapidly growing service industry, the pulse of the people, the story of Indian travel and the gap that almost demanded Vacation Ownership. MHRIL set about creating a concept that would emerge as a game-changer for Indian holiday-makers and grow to become the second-largest vacation ownership company in the world.

Club Mahindra Resorts

Club Mahindra operates over 110 resorts in India and overseas destinations and is affiliated with over 4,500 RCI resorts. It is the world's largest vacation ownership brand outside the United States (US).

Membership Details
Club Mahindra membership allows customers to avail of a week's holiday every year for 25 years based on eligibility and availability. The members may stay at Club Mahindra resorts, Holiday Club Oy resorts, or RCI-affiliated resorts by way of exchange. A ten-year option is also available for the members. Members opt for a specific season and apartment at the time of buying the membership. They may choose to plan their stay outside their season and apartment under the exchange program or carry forward their annual entitlements, subject to certain limits. The holiday seasons are divided into the four types: Purple, Red, White and Blue.

Acquisitions 
In 2014, MHRIL bought 18.8 percent stake in the European company, Holiday Club Resorts Oy.
In June 2014, the company acquired Finland-based Holiday Club Resorts for  600 crore.
In 2015, MHRIL increased its stake in Holiday Club Resorts Oy to 88 percent.
In 2016, MHRIL signed a pact to buy 12 percent stake in Nreach Online Services.
In 2017, MHRIL increased its stake in Finland's Holiday Club Resorts Oy by adding 6.33 percent to make it 91.94 percent.
In 2017, the company inked an agreement with Ideal Group of Companies to establish its presence in Sri Lanka.
In 2018, Suha Travel & Tours W.L.L Became The Official Distribution Partner In The Kingdom Of Bahrain

References

Companies based in Chennai
Hospitality companies of India
Mahindra Group
Timeshare chains
1996 establishments in Tamil Nadu
Indian companies established in 1996
Hospitality companies established in 1996
Companies listed on the National Stock Exchange of India
Companies listed on the Bombay Stock Exchange